All-trans-phytoene synthase (prephytoene-diphosphate synthase, phytoene synthetase, PSase, geranylgeranyl-diphosphate geranylgeranyltransferase, 15-trans-phytoene synthase) is an enzyme with systematic name geranylgeranyl-diphosphate:geranylgeranyl-diphosphate geranylgeranyltransferase (all-trans-phytoene forming). This enzyme catalyses the following chemical reaction

 2 geranylgeranyl diphosphate  all-trans-phytoene + 2 diphosphate (overall reaction)
(1a) 2 geranylgeranyl diphosphate  diphosphate + prephytoene diphosphate
(1b) prephytoene diphosphate  all-trans-phytoene + diphosphate

This enzyme requires Mn2+ for activity.

References

External links 

EC 2.5.1